The War Memorials of Aisne or Monuments aux Morts of Aisne are French war memorials in the Aisne, in the region of Picardy, commemorating those men of the Aisne region who died in World War I

Background
This region saw considerable action throughout World War I. In 1914, the Allied armies retreated through the region before the advancing German armies, who were following Von Schlieffen's plan of attack. At the Battle of the Marne, the German army's advance was halted and they retreated to the Aisne region and then dug in there before the so-called "race to the sea". The "war of movement" was to be short-lived and replaced by a static war of attrition, dominated by the trenches. The region was thereafter an integral part of the Western Front, the "Chemin des Dames" area, in particular, seeing the French army in continual action. This article deals with the local memorials which were erected in every city, town and village in France.

Some of the monument aux morts in the Aisne region

Images of Guise

Images Saint-Quentin

Images for Soissons

In Soisssons is a monument by Jan et Joël Martel, erected in 1925 to commemorate the activities of the "coopératives dans la reconstruction des régions sinistrées après la première guerre mondiale" (English: cooperatives in the reconstruction of disaster areas after the First World War) and the rôle played by Guy de Lubersac the président of the confédération générale des coopératives, the fédération départementale des unions de coopératives de reconstruction de l' Aisne and of the union soissonnaise des coopératives de reconstitution.

Nearby is the English sculptor Eric Kennington's "Monument to the Missing" which is dedicated to all those who lost their lives in this area but do not have known graves (their bodies were never found/identified). During the Battles of the Aisne and the Marne in 1918 there were nearly 4,000 Allied soldiers lost.

Eric Kennington's "Monument to the Missing"

See also
 World War I memorials
 War memorials (Oise)
 War memorials (Eastern Somme)
 War memorials (Western Somme)

References

External links 

 Sites of Memory (Historical markers, memorials, monuments, and cemeteries worldwide)

World War I memorials in France

fr:Monument aux morts